The Battle of Magango was fought in 1840 between Zulu and Boer forces at .  The Zulus were led by King Dingane.  The Boers were victorious.

History of South Africa